HD 219828 b is an extrasolar planet approximately 265 light years away in the constellation of Pegasus. This is a Neptune-mass planet at least 21 times more massive than Earth. The planet's composition is unknown, but it may be similar to the ice giants Uranus and Neptune, or alternatively it may be a mainly rocky like Super-Earth.

References

External links
 

Pegasus (constellation)
Giant planets
Exoplanets discovered in 2007
Exoplanets detected by radial velocity
Hot Neptunes